Tingi-Tingi Airport  is a highway strip airport serving the village of Tingi-Tingi in Lubutu Territory, Maniema Province, Democratic Republic of the Congo.

Some runway markings are visible.

See also

 List of airports in the Democratic Republic of the Congo

References

 Tingi-Tingi
 Great Circle Mapper - Tingi-Tingi

External links
 OpenStreetMap - Tingi-Tingi
 OurAirports - Tingi-Tingi

Airports in Maniema